DermNet is a New Zealand-based clinical resource website about dermatology and skin conditions. Its founder and current editor-in-chief is dermatologist and Adjunct Associate Professor Amanda Oakley.

History

DermNet was founded in 1995 by Amanda Oakley and a group of New Zealand dermatologists, with the aim of creating a certified online library of information about dermatological conditions. The DermNet website then launched in 1996 under the umbrella of the New Zealand Dermatological Society.

In 2013, DermNet was registered as a charitable trust and became the DermNet New Zealand Trust, under which the website is owned. As of 2017, around 2 million people access the website monthly.

Purpose
The purpose of DermNet is to provide authoritative information about skin diseases, conditions and treatments for dermatologists, students and medical researchers. The website has been praised for articles on little represented conditions, such as hyperhidrosis. As of November 2017, there are 2,300 pages and a library of 25,000 dermatology and dermatopathology images on the website. Pages and images are contributed and reviewed by health professionals and students from New Zealand and other countries including the United States, the United Kingdom, Canada, Mexico, Indonesia and Sri Lanka.

In 2017, DermNet released its first book, Dermatology Made Easy. The website also provides online medical courses for the continuing education of dermatologists.

DermNet also provides an interactive tool, DermDiag, which allows users to assess their own skin conditions. The tool allows the user to input increasingly specific levels of information regarding their condition, starting from location of ailment, up to number of blemishes, and provides the user with potential diagnoses. The provided diagnoses are ranked from COMMON to RARE, and images of each potential diagnosis are provided to the user, along with clinical features of each condition.

Awards
DermNet won the 2017 New Zealand Ministry of Health Clinician's Challenge Award for the development of a skin disease image recognition tool.

In 2017, Oakley won the Lifetime Achievement Award at the New Zealand Charity Technology Awards for her tenure as creator and editor-in-chief of the website.

In 2018, Oakley was awarded the New Zealand Order of Merit for services to dermatology as part of the Queen's Birthday Honours List.

References

External links
Official Website

1996 establishments in New Zealand
Medical websites
Dermatology journals
Internet properties established in 1995